A hybrid array is a form of hierarchical storage management that combines hard disk drives (HDDs) with solid-state drives (SSDs) for I/O speed improvements.

Hybrid storage arrays aim to mitigate the ever increasing price-performance gap between HDDs and DRAM by adding a non-volatile flash level to the memory hierarchy. Hybrid arrays thus aim to lower the cost per I/O, compared to using only SSDs for storage.  Hybrid architectures can be as simple as involving a single SSD cache for desktop or laptop computers, or can be more complex as configurations for data centers and cloud computing.

Implementations 

Some commercial products for building hybrid arrays include:
 Adaptec demonstrated the MaxIQ series in 2009.
 Apple's Fusion Drive
  Linux software includes bcache, dm-cache, and Flashcache (and its fork EnhanceIO).
 Condusive's ExpressCache is marketed for laptops.
 EMC Corporation VFcache was announced in 2012.
 Fusion-io acquired ioTurbine in 2011, and the product line it acquired by buying NexGen in 2013.
 Hitachi Accelerated Flash Storage (HAFS) used together with the Hitachi Dynamic Tiering software
 IBM Flash Cache Storage Accelerator (FCSA) server software
 Intel's Smart Response Technology for desktop
 Intel's Cache Acceleration Software for servers and workstations 
 LSI CacheCade software for their controllers
 Marvell's HyperDuo controllers
 Microsoft's Automated Tiering (since Windows 2012 R2)
 NetApp's Flash Cache, Flash Pool, Flash Accel
 Oracle Corporation markets products such as Exadata Smart Cache Flash, and the FS1 flash storage system.
 Microsoft ReadyBoost allows personal computers to USB flash drives as cache.
 Nvelo DataPlex SSD caching software was announced in 2011, and was acquired by Samsung in 2012.
 SanDisk FlashSoft for Windows, Linux, and vSphere
 Products are offered by vendors like AMI StorTrends, Tegile Systems, Reduxio, and Tintri.
 ZFS using hybrid storage pools, are used for example in some Oracle Corporation products.

See also 
 Hybrid drive built-in flash cache, handled by firmware
 Automated tiered storage another name for hierarchical storage management
 The "five-minute rule" for caching

References 

Data management
Solid-state caching
Memory management software